Helen Margaret Newlove, Baroness Newlove (born 28 December 1961) is a Warrington-based community reform campaigner who was appointed as the Victims' Commissioner by the UK government in 2012. She is currently serving as a Deputy Speaker in the House of Lords. Helen Newlove came to prominence after her husband, Garry Newlove was murdered by three youths in 2007. After his death she set up a number of foundations that aimed to tackle the UK drinking culture as well as providing support to young people. Newlove was given a peerage in the 2010 Dissolution Honours list and sits in the House of Lords as a Conservative.

Campaigns
Newlove's 47-year-old husband Garry Newlove was murdered in August 2007 in Warrington, Cheshire, after confronting a gang of drunken youths who were vandalising her car – the culmination of a long-running campaign of youth gang crime in the Padgate area of the town. Five months later, three local teenagers were found guilty of murdering Garry Newlove, who died in hospital 36 hours after being repeatedly kicked and punched outside his house. They were sentenced to life imprisonment with recommended minimum terms of between 12 and 17 years. Two other suspects, also teenagers, were tried for the murder but found not guilty.

Witnesses estimated that around ten people were involved in the attack on Garry Newlove, and most or all of them had been involved in earlier incidents of vandalism. One of the three teenagers found guilty of the murder had been released on bail hours earlier after appearing in court charged with assaulting another man in the local area.

Since her husband's death, Helen Newlove has campaigned against the UK's binge-drink culture and calling for better training for landlords and bar staff, as well as shop workers involved in the sale of alcohol. She has more prominently campaigned to clamp down on the sort of criminal activities which contributed to the death of her husband, campaigned for stiffer sentences for serious offences, and campaigned for improved support for victims of crime – highlighting the lack of support that she and her family received after the murder, and highlighting the lack of support given to many other victims of crime (ranging from the families of murder victims to families who have been bereaved by road accidents).

Helen Newlove set up Newlove Warrington on 8 November 2008, which aims to make the town a safer and better place for people to live and to improve facilities and opportunities for the children through education and life skills for the better of communities. The three goals for the campaign were to inspire people to lead a more purposeful life; motivating people to enrich their lives; providing opportunities for positive interaction with communities.

Newlove has extended her campaign nationally by joining forces with the local and national media.

Peerage
In May 2010, Newlove was given a peerage in the 2010 Dissolution Honours list. After the announcement was made Newlove commented that "I am just an ordinary woman, propelled into high profile by a set of horrifying circumstances which I wish with all my heart had never occurred." Newlove took up her seat in the House of Lords as a Conservative on 15 July 2010 when she was introduced as Baroness Newlove, of Warrington in the County of Cheshire.

On 5 March 2021, Newlove took up the office of Deputy Speaker of the House of Lords.

Victims' Commissioner
On 21 December 2012 it was announced that Helen Newlove had been appointed as the new Victims' Commissioner, a role requiring her to liaise with ministers to offer advice on aspects of the Criminal Justice System that affect victims and witnesses. The three-year post had previously been held by Louise Casey, but had been vacant since Casey stepped down in October 2011. She stepped down from the role in 2019.

References

External links
Newlove Warrington charity founded and run by Helen Newlove

1961 births
Conservative Party (UK) life peers
Life peeresses created by Elizabeth II
Living people
People from Warrington
Place of birth missing (living people)